Rahimtulla Tower, also known as the Rahimtulla Trust Building, is a tower in the Upper Hill neighbourhood of Nairobi, Kenya.

The tower is a reinforced concrete structure, and clad with blue-tinted glass and white louvre tiles. The tower has twenty-two storeys, including a double floor-height lobby, plus two basement floors. It is 16 storeys smaller than the New Central Bank Tower and the second tallest building in the country after the UAP Old Mutual Tower.

The building is capped by a 30-metre high mast, for television and radio communication. The main tenants are iWay Africa, PriceWaterhouseCoopers and Dhanush InfoTech. The architect is Planning Systems Services, the structural engineers Mangat, I.B. Patel & Partners, the main contractors were Laxmanbhai Construction and the services engineers for the project were Howard Humphreys (Kenya) Limited.

Tenants 
Spencon once had its head office here. It moved out of Rahimtulla in 2015, to Muguga, Kiambu County.

References

External links 
 Howard Humphreys (the project engineers) – Page on Rahimtulla Tower

Office buildings completed in 1999
Buildings and structures in Nairobi
Skyscraper office buildings in Kenya
1999 establishments in Kenya